Meniscotherium is an extinct genus of dog-sized mammal which lived 54–38 million years ago. It was a herbivore and had hooves. Fossils have been found in Utah, New Mexico. and Colorado. Many individuals have been found together, indicating that it lived in groups.

Body mass in M. chamense is estimated to be 5–17 kg, making it about the size of a small dog.

A 2014 cladistic analysis places it within stem perissodactyls.

References

Condylarths
Eocene mammals of North America
Fossil taxa described in 1874
Prehistoric placental genera